Sinocyclocheilus yishanensis  (common name: Yishan golden-line barbel) is a species of cave fish in the family Cyprinidae. It is endemic to Guangxi province in southern China and known from the Liu River, a tributary of the Pearl River. Its specific name yishanensis refers to the Yishan County (now called Yizhou ) where its type locality is.

Description
It grows to  standard length and has a scaled, slightly humpbacked body.

Habitat
The type locality was a subterranean river that has now been changed into a reservoir.

References 

Cave fish
yishanensis
Freshwater fish of China
Endemic fauna of Guangxi